Nalci (spelled as Nalchi in transliterations from Persian) is a family name of people from Iran and Turkey meaning horseshoe maker. The variant occupational -cı ending appears in Turkish spellings.

Nalcı is also the tribal name of an Alevi group found in Ordu Province, Turkey.

People named Nalcı

Aris Nalcı, executive editor of the Armenian weekly newspaper Agos published in Istanbul, Turkey
Hüseyin Nalcı, Mayor of Gündoğdu, Manavgat, Antalya Province, Turkey

See also
Nalchik, capital city of the Kabardino-Balkar Republic, Russia, meaning small horseshoe, some inhabitants use this as a surname

References

Iranian-language surnames
Turkish-language surnames